Driade has been borne by at least two ships of the Italian Navy and may refer to:

 , a  launched in 1942 and stricken in 1966.
 , a  launched in 1989. 

Italian Navy ship names